Kali is a Michelin Guide-starred restaurant in Hollywood, California.

See also
 List of Michelin starred restaurants in Los Angeles and Southern California

References 

Michelin Guide starred restaurants in California

External links

Culture of Hollywood, Los Angeles
Michelin Guide starred restaurants in California
Restaurants in Los Angeles